Umeå School of Architecture (abbreviated UMA) was founded in 2009 as the fourth academic school in Sweden to provide a professional degree in architecture. It is part of Umeå University.

The five-year architectural programme started in fall 2009 at provisionary premises in central Umeå, but subsequently moved to a new building designed by Danish architect firm Henning Larsen Architects, close to the Umeå Institute of Design and the Umeå Academy of Fine Arts at the Umeå Arts Campus. Master's degree programs started in the autumn of 2010. All education is in English.

Programmes 

The School offers a five-year programme in Architecture.

Students with an undergraduate qualification from another institution can join the programme in year four and earn a Master's degree in Architecture and Urban Design.

See also 
Umeå Institute of Design
Umeå Institute of Technology
Umeå School of Business

Sources

External links 
 Umeå School of Architecture web site

Architecture schools
University departments in Sweden
Umeå University
Educational institutions established in 2009
2009 establishments in Sweden